D.A.V. (Dayanand Anglo Vedic) Kapil Dev Public School is a public school in Ranchi, Jharkhand, India. The school is just 3 km from Ranchi Railway Station on a land given on lease for 99 years by the A.G. Co-Operative Society, and is another link in the chain of more than 600 DAV Public Schools all over the country, managed by the DAV College Managing Committee, New Delhi. On 17 September 1993, Padma Bhushan G. P. Chopra, President, DAV CMC inaugurated the building and flagged off its journey.

Currently the School has more than 3,300 students, up to 10+2 level (Science & Commerce) and is affiliated with the Central Board of Secondary Education in New Delhi. It is divided into two buildings, a Senior and a Junior building. There is one lab each for Physics, Chemistry, Biology, Language (English) and Mathematics, and two labs for Computer Science.

See also
Education in India
[[Central Board of Secondary Education ((CBSE))

References

External links
 

Primary schools in India
High schools and secondary schools in Jharkhand
Schools in Ranchi
Educational institutions established in 1991
1991 establishments in Bihar